North Broad Street Historic District is a national historic district located at Norwich in Chenango County, New York.  The district has 41 contributing buildings.  It includes an area of detached residences in a variety of popular 19th- and 20th-century architectural styles.

It was added to the National Register of Historic Places in 1978.

References

External links

Historic districts on the National Register of Historic Places in New York (state)
Historic districts in Chenango County, New York
National Register of Historic Places in Chenango County, New York